Fredrick Leslie Steel (1884 – before 1945) was an English footballer who played for Stoke.

Career
Steel was born in Stoke-upon-Trent and played amateur football with Ashwood Villa before joining Stoke in 1909. He played in the first three matches of the 1909–10 season which included an 11–0 win over Merthyr Town before returning to amateur football with Lancaster Town.

Career statistics

References

1884 births
Year of death missing
Footballers from Stoke-on-Trent
English footballers
Association football midfielders
Stoke City F.C. players
Lancaster City F.C. players
Southern Football League players